Arne Holst (March 16, 1904 – December 27, 1991) was a Norwegian bobsledder who competed from the late 1940s to the early 1950s. Competing in two Winter Olympics, he earned his best finish of fifth in the four-man event at St. Moritz in 1948.

References
1948 bobsleigh two-man results
1948 bobsleigh four-man results
1952 bobsleigh two-man results
1952 bobsleigh four-man results
Bobsleigh two-man results: 1932-56 and since 1964 

Olympic bobsledders of Norway
Bobsledders at the 1948 Winter Olympics
Bobsledders at the 1952 Winter Olympics
Norwegian male bobsledders
1904 births
1991 deaths